The 2002 Ju-Jitsu World Championship were the 5th edition of the Ju-Jitsu World Championships, and were held in Punta del Este, Uruguay from November 23 to November 24, 2002.

Schedule 
23.11.2002 – Men's and Women's Fighting System, Men's and Women's Duo System – Classic
24.11.2002 – Men's and Women's Fighting System, Mixed Duo System – Classic

European Ju-Jitsu

Fighting System

Men's events

Women's events

Duo System

Duo Classic events

Links

References

External links
TOP6 results from JJIF site (PDF)